Group 2 of UEFA Euro 1984 was one of only two groups in the final tournament's initial group stage. It began on 14 June and was completed on 20 June. The group consisted of West Germany, Spain, Portugal, and Romania.

Spain won the group and advanced to the semi-finals along with Portugal. West Germany and Romania were eliminated.

Teams

Standings

In the semi-finals,
The winner of Group 2, Spain, advanced to play the runner-up of Group 1, Denmark.
The runner-up of Group 2, Portugal, advanced to play the winner of Group 1, France.

Matches

West Germany vs Portugal

Romania vs Spain

West Germany vs Romania

Portugal vs Spain

West Germany vs Spain

Portugal vs Romania

References

External links
UEFA Euro 1984 Group 2

Group 2
Group
Group
Group
Group